Mind Thrust is a 1981 video game published by Tandy Corporation.

Gameplay
Mind Thrust is a game in which the player defeats the computer by either removing all playing pieces of the opponent, or by creating a chain of pieces that covers the width of the board.

Reception
Barbour Stokes reviewed the game for Computer Gaming World, and stated that "The rules and plays of Mind Thrust are easily and quickly learned making it an excellent home demonstration game to make believers out of those non-gamers and non-computerists that may drop in."

References

External links
Review in 80 Micro
Review in Creative Computing

1981 video games
Digital tabletop games
Turn-based strategy video games
TRS-80 games
TRS-80-only games
Video games developed in the United States